The Hispaniolan two-lined skink (Mabuya hispaniolae) is a species of skink endemic to
the Dominican Republic on Hispaniola.

References

Mabuya
Reptiles described in 2012
Reptiles of the Dominican Republic
Lizards of the Caribbean
Endemic fauna of the Dominican Republic
Taxa named by Stephen Blair Hedges
Taxa named by Caitlin E. Conn